Zonulispira crocata, common name the Sanibel turrid, is a species of sea snail, a marine gastropod mollusc in the family Pseudomelatomidae.

Description
The length of the shell varies between 20 mm and 29 mm.

The shell is pyramidally oblong, transversely elevately striated and longitudinally ribbed. The body whorl is furnished with a small gibbous tubercle. The siphonal canal is very short. The aperture is short. The sinus broad and large. The color of the shell is whitish, covered with a saffron-olive epidermis.

Distribution
Z. crocata can be found off the western coast of Florida to the Florida Keys.

References

External links
  Rosenberg, G.; Moretzsohn, F.; García, E. F. (2009). Gastropoda (Mollusca) of the Gulf of Mexico, pp. 579–699 in: Felder, D.L. and D.K. Camp (eds.), Gulf of Mexico–Origins, Waters, and Biota. Texas A&M Press, College Station, Texas
 
 Gatsropods.com: Zonulispira crocata.

crocata
Gastropods described in 1845